Saurimo Airport is a public use airport serving the city of Saurimo in Lunda Sul Province, Angola. It was formerly known as Henrique de Carvalho Airport.

The Saurimo VOR-DME (Ident: VSA) is located on the field.

Airlines and destinations

See also
 List of airports in Angola
 Transport in Angola

References

External links 
 
 OurAirports - Saurimo
 OpenStreetMap - Saurimo

Airports in Angola
Lunda Sul Province